Qazim Baba also known as Kasim Baba of Kostur was a 15th-century holy man of Albanian origin. Standing on a hill of Kastoria, he is supposed to have converted many Christians to Islam during the Mehmed II (the Conqueror) period.

According to John Kingsley Birge and his book The Bektashi Order of Dervishes, it is believed that a Bektashi named Kasim Baba have come and settled in the time of Muhammad (in 1451-1481). He writes that Zylfo Baba of the Turas tekke near Korche mentioned Kasim Baba as one of the early Bektashi missionaries particularly in the district of Kastoria. Also, Türabı Baba in his Historia e Përgjithshme e Bektashinjët, page 54, spoke of Kasim Baba who in 1378 came to Kosturit.

References

15th-century Albanian people
Albanian Muslims